Enodia portlandia, the southern pearly eye, Portland pearlyeye or just pearly eye, is a butterfly of the family Nymphalidae. It is found in the United States from eastern Oklahoma and eastern Texas east through the southeast.

The wingspan is 56–70 mm. The upperside is brown with dark eyespots at the margins. The underside is light brown. Adults feed on sap, rotting fruit, carrion and dung.

The larvae feed on the leaves of Arundinaria tecta. The species overwinters in the larval stage.

Subspecies
Enodia portlandia portlandia
Enodia portlandia floralae (Heitzman & dos Passos, 1974) 
Enodia portlandia missarkae (Heitzman & dos Passos, 1974)

References

Butterflies described in 1781
Elymniini
Taxa named by Johan Christian Fabricius